Marouflage is a technique for affixing a painted canvas (intended as a mural) to a wall, using an adhesive that hardens as it dries, such as plaster or cement.

History

A French word originally referring to sticky, partly hardened scraps of paint, marouflage is a 3,000-year-old technique. Historically, artists used several types of adhesives including a rabbit-skin glue. White lead ore was used in the 19th and 20th centuries in the mixture to help it dry.

A thin coat of the adhesive is applied to both the wall and the canvas. Once the canvas is mounted to the wall, pressure is exerted with rubber hand rollers to smooth the canvas and remove any bubbles.

Uses

Conservation
In art conservation, the word can be term of art meaning the removal of the painted surface from its underlying support, usually a stretched canvas. The process is more typically called transferring and can cause significant damage. Twenty-first century conservators seldom need to resort to this technique.

Murals
Intended murals are normally painted on large canvas in the studio and attached to the wall on site, using a starch based glue (applied to the wall only), the murals can then be moved (by a professional) and re-instated elsewhere if required.  The damage caused to the painting if removed using this technique is minimal.

References

Mayer, Ralph. The Artist's Handbook of Materials and Techniques Viking Adult; 5th revised and updated edition, 1991. 

Painting techniques
Conservation and restoration of paintings